Alapadna is a genus of moths of the family Noctuidae. The genus was erected by Turner in 1902.

Species
 Alapadna micropis Hampson, 1926
 Alapadna pauropis Turner, 1902

References

Catocalinae
Noctuoidea genera